Avetheropoda, or "bird theropods", is a clade that includes carnosaurians and coelurosaurs to the exclusion of other dinosaurs.

Definition
Avetheropoda was named by Gregory S. Paul in 1988, and was first defined as a clade by Currie and Padian in 1997, to include Allosaurus, modern birds, and other animals descended from their most recent ancestor. In 1999, Paul Sereno named another group, Neotetanurae, for the clade containing Allosauroidea and Coelurosauria, and excluding other tetanurans such as megalosauroids, but this definition was published slightly later.
A monophyletic Avetheropoda is recovered in many papers, however recent findings suggest a monophyletic Carnosauria model with allosauroids and megalosauroids  being each other's closest relatives instead of Allosaurs and Coelurosaurs.

Classification
The cladogram presented below follows a phylogenetic analysis published by Zanno and Makovicky in 2013.

References

Tetanurans
Taxa named by Gregory S. Paul